Khalil Al Hindawi (1906, Sidon – 1976, Aleppo) was a Syrian writer and poet.

Early life
Hindawi finished his studies at Al Makasid Islamic and Charitable Association in Saïda in 1924, and started teaching there when he was 17 years old.  He was exiled from Lebanon by French authorities after delivering a poem in a national ceremony, welcoming Riad as-Solh, who was coming back from his exile for the first time in 1928.  He was sent to Syria, and he stayed in Damascus during the First World War.

Career

In 1929, he worked as a teacher at Deir ez-Zor high school in Syria, and started writing in Al Risala and Al Muktataf magazines. In 1939, he moved to Aleppo at the request of Saadallah al-Jabiri (later to become Prime Minister of Syria in 1943). He taught in Aleppo high schools until his retirement in 1966.

Hindawi is considered by the Syrian Ministry of Education to be the first teacher who knew the value of the text and was interested in analyzing it and offering insights into the form of a literature review. He did that in the 1930s, when people were only repeating the translation of the writers at that time, and totally depending on literary historians' provisions.

He was appointed Director of the Arab Cultural Center of Aleppo in 1958.

He was a member of the United Arab Republic delegation to the Asian-African writers' conference that was held in Tashkent in 1958.

He was a member of the Syrian delegation to the first Arab writers conference that was held in Beit Mery, Lebanon in 1954.

He was a member of the Syrian delegation to the Asian-African writers' conference that was held in Beirut in 1967.

He was a member of the Syrian delegation to the Arab writers' conference that was held in Damascus in 1971.

He held the presidency of the Arab Writers Union in Aleppo until his death in 1976.

A ceremony in the honor of Khalil Al hindawi was organized by the Arab Writers Union and the faculty of Arts at Aleppo University in March 1974. The occasion was to mark half a century of his literary work.

On 27 November 1976, he was granted the Honor Medal of Syrian Merit, First Class.

Works

 Abū al-ʻAlāʼ al-Maʻarrī, 973–1057. Tajdīd Risālat al-ghufrān [taʼlīf] 1965
 Yawm al-Yarmūk 1974
 Mukhtārāt min al-aʻmāl al-kāmilah / Khalīl al-Hindāwī ; iʻdād ʻUmar al-Daqqāq, Walīd Ikhlāṣī. 1980
 Min ajwāʼ al-Sharq : Hārūt wa-Mārūt 2008
 Tajdīd Risālat al-ghufrān. 1965
 Ḥāfiẓ Ibrāhīm, shāʻir al-Nīl.
 Damʻat Ṣalāḥ al-Dīn. 1958
 Yawm Dāḥis wa-al-Ghabrāʼ. 1974
 Ayyām al-ʻArab. 1974
 Ayyām al-ʻIrāq. 1974
 Maa̕ al-imām ʻAlī. 1962
 Yawm al-Basūs. 1974
 Yawm al-Qādisīyah. 1974
 Muntakhab min al-Aghānī. 1967
 Taysīr al-inshāʼ.

References

20th-century Syrian writers
1906 births
1976 deaths
People from Sidon
Syrian poets
20th-century poets
Arab people of Indian descent
India–Syria relations